The Gorokhovskoye peat railway is located in Kirov Oblast, Russia.

Current status 
Gorokhovskoye peat railway emerged in the 1960s, in the area Kotelnichsky District, in a settlement named Komsomolthe. The peat railway was built for hauling peat and workers and operates year-round. Operations consist of peat and passenger transport. Peat is transshipped on broad gauge  rail line and taken to Kirov to a combined heat and power (CHP) power station.

Rolling stock

Locomotives 
TU4 – № 818, 1323, 2961, 2594
ESU2A – № 848, 927

Railroad car
Boxcar
Flatcar
Tank car
Snowplow
Tank car – fire train
Passenger car
Open wagon for peat
Hopper car to transport track ballast

Work trains 
Crane GK-5
Track UPS-1- № 50
Track laying cranes PPR2ma

Gallery

See also

Narrow-gauge railways in Russia
Dymnoye peat railway
Otvorskoye peat railway
Pishchalskoye peat railway

References and sources

External links

  Official Website 
 Photo – project «Steam Engine» 
 «The site of the railroad» S. Bolashenko 

750 mm gauge railways in Russia
Rail transport in Kirov Oblast